Carlos Santiago Nagüel (born 28 January 1993) is an Argentine professional footballer who plays as a midfielder for San Telmo.

Career
Nagüel started his youth career with Club Almafuerte, before joining Argentinos Juniors in 2003. Eight years later, he began his senior career with Argentinos Juniors. He made his senior debut in an Argentine Primera División defeat to Atlético de Rafaela on 25 October, before netting his first goal two appearances later during a victory at home to Olimpo. In total, Nagüel featured sixty-two times in his opening three seasons with Argentinos Juniors. The club were relegated in 2013–14, he subsequently made seven appearances in Primera B Nacional prior to departing to join top-flight team Racing Club in February 2015.

Thirteen appearances in all competitions followed in his debut campaign of 2015. 2016 saw Nagüel loaned out twice by Racing Club. He joined Unión Santa Fe on 19 January and went onto make just four appearances before returning to his parent club. In July, Defensa y Justicia temporarily signed Nagüel. Similarly as to with Unión Santa Fe, he struggled for match time and left following only one appearance (vs. Vélez Sarsfield on 13 November). On 13 September 2017, Primera B Nacional side Brown became Nagüel's third loan club. He scored on his debut appearance in a 0–1 win over Almagro in September.

In February 2019, Nagüel switched Argentina for Uruguay by agreeing a move to Atenas of the Segunda División. Nagüel then had a spell with Deportivo Maldonado from February 2020, before returning to Argentina and signing with Deportivo Morón in March 2021. Ahead of the 2022 season, Nagüel joined San Telmo.

Career statistics
.

References

External links

1993 births
Living people
Footballers from Buenos Aires
Argentine footballers
Association football midfielders
Argentine expatriate footballers
Argentine Primera División players
Primera Nacional players
Argentinos Juniors footballers
Racing Club de Avellaneda footballers
Unión de Santa Fe footballers
Defensa y Justicia footballers
Club Atlético Brown footballers
Atenas de San Carlos players
Deportivo Maldonado players
Deportivo Morón footballers
San Telmo footballers
Expatriate footballers in Uruguay
Argentine expatriate sportspeople in Uruguay